Badr bin Abdullah bin Mohammed bin Farhan Al Saud ( Badr bin ʿAbdullāh bin Moḥammed bin Farḥān Āl Suʿūd; born 16 August 1985) is a Saudi Arabian businessman and government official who is the inaugural Saudi Arabian minister of culture. He is in charge of various key positions directly related to the execution of Saudi Vision 2030. Prior to his appointment as minister of culture, he was the chairman of Saudi Research and Marketing Group.

Early life and education
Prince Badr was born on 16 August 1985. He received a bachelor's degree in law from King Saud University.

Business career
Prince Badr began his career as a business executive and investor in the fields of energy, real estate and telecoms.

In December 2015, Prince Badr was appointed chairman of Saudi Research and Marketing Group (SRMG), one of the largest media publishing companies in the Middle East, which subsequently expanded its operations into the United States and United Kingdom. Further developments during his tenure included a deal in September 2017 with Bloomberg to launch its first Arabic-language news service, Bloomberg Al Arabiya; followed by the acquisition of a 51% stake in the Saudi online financial news service Argaam.

Government positions

Royal Commission for Al-'Ula

In June 2017 Prince Badr was appointed as governor of the Royal Commission for Al-'Ula, a newly established body to develop the 2,000 year-old historical site of Al-'Ula, in Madinah province, into a cultural attraction. In April 2018 he signed an agreement with French minister of Europe and foreign affairs Jean-Yves Le Drian to involve French expertise in the restoration of Al-'Ula over a ten-year period.

Minister of Culture and other positions
In April 2018 Prince Badr was appointed to the board of the General Authority for Culture.

On 2 June 2018 Prince Badr was appointed as Saudi Arabia's first minister of culture and stepped down as chairman of SRMG. The ministry's mandate is to advance the cultural programs within Saudi Vision 2030. In his first official statement, Prince Badr said the ministry would seek to enhance Saudi identity and would support the efforts of young people in creative fields.

References

1985 births
Living people
King Saud University alumni
Saudi Arabian princes
21st-century Saudi Arabian politicians
20th-century Saudi Arabian businesspeople
21st-century Saudi Arabian businesspeople
Culture ministers of Saudi Arabia